KHTN (104.7 FM) is a radio station broadcasting a Rhythmic Top 40 format. Licensed to Planada, California, United States, the station serves the Merced area. The station is owned by Stephens Media Group, through licensee SMG-Merced, LLC. Its studios are in Merced and its transmitter is near Mount Bullion.
KHTN has been a monitored Rhythmic reporter in both Mediabase and Nielsen BDS since their 1992 launch.

History
James H. Rose's Los Banos Broadcasting Company, owner of KLBS 1330 AM, obtained the construction permit for 95.9 MHz in Los Banos, California on March 10, 1964. Several months later, Los Banos Broadcasting Company was sold to John R. McAdam and Edwin Cordeiro. The FM station did not sign on until 1967. In October 1979, new ownership filed to move the station to 104.7 MHz, which brought with it a class increase and a wider coverage area. KLBS-FM signed on the new frequency in the spring of 1980, retaining its progressive rock format; the station was known as "K-105" and had the slogan of "The Central Valley's Rock and Roll Alternative".
In May 1982, the station was sold to new owners and the station changed its call letters to KSNN and updated their format to satellite-delivered Adult Contemporary as "Kissin' 105."  In April 1992, the station switched to its current Rhythmic CHR format, adopted the call letters of KHTN,  and branded itself as "HOT 105."  In 2004, the station re-branded itself 'Hot 104.7 - Number One For Hip Hop. By 2011, KHTN dropped the "Number One For Hip-Hop" slogan and began to broaden its playlist to include Rhythmic Pop/Dance product, although the Hip-Hop tracks continues to be played at the station.

Acquisition by Stephens Media
On July 1, 2019, Mapleton Communications announced its intent to sell its remaining 37 stations to Stephens Media Group in a $21 million deal. Stephens began operating the station that same day. The sale was consummated on September 30, 2019.

Previous logo
 (KHTN's logo from 2004 to 2011)

References

External links

FCC History Cards for KHTN

HTN
Rhythmic contemporary radio stations in the United States
Mass media in Merced County, California
Merced, California
Radio stations established in 1967
1978 establishments in California